Fernando Soto Aparicio (October 1, 1933 – May 2, 2016) was a Colombian poet, storyteller, playwright, novelist, librettist, and screenwriter. He was born in Socha, in the Department of Boyacá. Fernando Soto Aparicio spent his childhood in Santa Rosa de Viterbo. He is remembered for the novel The rebellion of the rats. After several decades as a professor at various universities in the country, in 1961 he was exalted with the prize Selecciones Lengua Española, in 1970 he received the Casa de las Américas Prize, and a year later, the prize City of Murcia. In total, he wrote about 70 literary works, among them novels, poems, books of short stories, as well as theatre plays.

Literary works

The works of Fernando Soto Aparicio explore society in all its facets possible to portraying the relationship of individuals with the powers established (religious, legal, economical, military). Among his prolific work there are novels, books of poems, short stories, children's literature, essays, plays and scripts for film and television. Among them are:

Novels
 Después empezará la madrugada, 1960
 Los bienaventurados, 1960
 La rebelión de las ratas, 1962
 Mientras llueve, 1966
 El espejo sombrío, 1967
 Viaje al pasado, 1970
 La siembra de Camilo, 1971
 Viaje a la claridad, 1972
 Mundo roto, 1973
 Puerto silencio, 1974
 Proceso a un ángel, 1977
 Los funerales de América, 1978
 Viva el ejército, 1979
 Camino que anda, 1980
 Hermano hombre, 1982
 La cuerda loca, 1985
 La demonia, 1987
 Palabra de fuego, 1988
 Jazmín desnuda, 1987
 Los últimos sueños, 1990
 Los juegos de Merlina, 1992
 El color del viento, 1993
 Sólo el silencio grita, 1993
 Y el hombre creó a Dios, 1999
 La última guerra, 2000
 Quinto mandamiento, 2000
 No morirá el amor, 2001
 Los hijos del viento, 2003
 La noche del girasol, 2004
 Todos los ríos son el mismo mar, 2007
 El sueño de la anaconda, 2008
 La agonía de una flor, 2010
 La sed del agua, 2015
Poetry
 Diámetro del corazón, 1964
 Motivos para Mariángela, 1966
 Oración personal a Jesucristo, 1967
 Palabras a una muchacha, 1967
 Canto personal a la libertad, 1969
 Cartas a Beatriz, carta abierta a una guerrillera, 1970
 Sonetos con forma de mujer, 1976
 La paz sea con nosotros, 1980
 Pasos en la tierra, 1984
 Lecturas para acompañar al amor, 1989
 El amor nuestro de cada día, 1994
 Carta de bienvenida a la paz, 1999
 Las fronteras del alma, 2004
 Testigo de excepción, 2005
 Alba de otoño: sonetos, 2008
 Corazón, escribámosle, 2012
 La muerte de la doncella: fantasia poética, 2015

Short story
 Solamente la vida, 1961
 Los viajeros de la eternidad, 1995
 Bendita sea tu pureza, 1999

Children's literature
 Lunela, 1986
 Guacas y guacamayas, 1995
 Alfajuego, 2000
 El corazón de la tierra, 2008
 El duende de la guarda, 2013

Other
 La estrecha relación entre literatura, filosofía e historia; Cómo se investiga para una novela histórica, 1989, conferencias
 Para estrenar las alas, 2001
 Cartilla para mejorar el mundo, 2002
 Pedro Pascasio Martínez Rojas: héroe antes de los doce años, 2005, biografía
 Taller para la enseñanza de la felicidad, 2011, reflexiones
 La amante de Lubina, 2012, teatro
 Memorias de la memoria, 2012
 Bitácora de un agonizante: camino para cien voces, 2015
 ¡Yo tengo derechos y también... tengo deberes!, 2015

Compilations, selections, anthologies
 Presencia del amor: antología personal, 2010

References

1933 births
2016 deaths
Colombian male novelists
20th-century Colombian novelists
20th-century Colombian poets
Colombian male poets
21st-century Colombian poets
21st-century male writers
20th-century male writers
21st-century Colombian novelists